Carlton is a village and former civil parish, now in the parish of Carlton and Chellington, in the Bedford district, in the ceremonial county of Bedfordshire, England. The River Great Ouse runs just to the north of the village. Nearby places are Chellington, Harrold, Pavenham, Turvey, Lavendon and Odell. In 1931 the parish had a population of 340.

Carlton was recorded in the Domesday Book of 1086 as a parish within the Hundred of Willey. It was for some time spelt Carleton. On 1 April 1934, the separate parishes of Carlton and Chellington merged to become one the parish named "Carlton and Chellington".

The village has historically been laid out in a rectangular road pattern, the main parts of the village being around the roads of Bridgend and the High Street, with The Moor and The Causeway making up the rectangle's other sides. During the twentieth century the areas in between were filled out with housing along the roads of Rectory Close, Carriers Way, Street Close, and Beeby Way.

Carlton Park is located in Rectory Close and features three swings, a small basketball court, a football pitch and a 1.5 meter slide. It also features one of the main landmarks of Carlton, its giant oak tree.

Carlton's church is Saint Mary the Virgin, dating from 950AD with a font from c. 1150 sited outside the current village.

Carlton has two pubs, The Royal Oak and The Fox. There is a Post Office and village shop located on Carlton's busiest through road, Bridgend. There is also one school, Carlton C of E Primary School and a village hall which is also used as the school's assembly and sports hall. The village has an Emmaus community which includes a busy cafe / restaurant, furniture repair workshop and secondhand shop with furniture, books, china, clothes, and bric-a-brac. Also situated on the Emmaus site is Carlton Squash Club, a community run club that offers two courts for both squash and racketball. The courts were opened in 1980 by the football manager Brian Clough, who himself was a keen squash player.

The village was struck by an F1/T2 tornado on 23 November 1981, as part of the record-breaking nationwide tornado outbreak on that day.

References

External links

Village web site
History of Carlton
Carlton History

Villages in Bedfordshire
Populated places on the River Great Ouse
Former civil parishes in Bedfordshire
Borough of Bedford